Phase or phases may refer to:

Science
State of matter, or phase, one of the distinct forms in which matter can exist
Phase (matter), a region of space throughout which all physical properties are essentially uniform
Phase space, a mathematical space in which each possible state of a physical system is represented by a point — this equilibrium point is also referred to as a "microscopic state"
Phase space formulation, a formulation of quantum mechanics in phase space
Phase (waves), the position of a point in time (an instant) on a waveform cycle
Instantaneous phase, generalization for both cyclic and non-cyclic phenomena
AC phase, the phase offset between alternating current electric power in multiple conducting wires
Single-phase electric power, distribution of AC electric power in a system where the voltages of the supply vary in unison
Three-phase electric power, a common method of AC electric power generation, transmission, and distribution
Phase problem, the loss of information (the phase) from a physical measurement
Phase factor, a complex scalar used in quantum mechanics
in continuous Fourier transform, the angle of a complex coefficient representing the phase of one sinusoidal component

Other sciences
Archaeological phase, a discrete period of occupation at an archaeological site
Color phase, in biology, a group of individuals within a species with a particular coloration

Gametic phase, in genetics, the relationship between alleles at two chromosomal loci
Lunar phase, the appearance of the Moon as viewed from the Earth
Planetary phase, the appearance of the illuminated section of a planet
Phase separation, in physical chemistry, the separation of a liquid mixture into two immiscible liquids above and below a meniscus
Phase (syntax), in linguistics, a cyclic domain (proposed by Noam Chomsky)
In biology, a part of the cell cycle in which cells divide (mitosis) and/or reproduce (meiosis)

Music
Phase (band), a Greek alternative rock band
Phases (band), an indie pop American band, formerly known as JJAMZ
Phase (album), a debut studio album by an English singer Jack Garratt
Phases (The Who album), a box set of albums by The Who
Phases (I See Stars album), 2015
Phase (Mildlife album), a 2017 album by Mildlife
Phases (Angel Olsen album), 2017
"Phases", a song by English alternative rock band Keane from their 2019 album Cause and Effect

Other entertainment
"Phases" (Buffy the Vampire Slayer), a 1998 episode of the TV series Buffy the Vampire Slayer
Phases (.hack), fictional monsters in the .hack franchise
Phase, an incarnation of the DC Comics character usually known as Phantom Girl

Other uses
Phase 10, a card game created by Fundex Games
Phase (video game), a 2007 music game for the iPod developed by Harmonix Music Systems
Phase (combat), usually a period of combat within a larger military operation
A musical composition using Steve Reich's phasing technique

See also
 Phase 1 (disambiguation)
 Phase 2 (disambiguation)
 Phase 3 (disambiguation)
 Phase 4 (disambiguation)
 Phase 5 (disambiguation)
 Phase space (disambiguation)
 Phaser (disambiguation)
 Phasing (disambiguation)
 Phasor (disambiguation)
 Phaze, a fictional world in Piers Anthony's Apprentice Adept series
 Faze (disambiguation)
 FASOR (disambiguation)
 Stage (disambiguation)